The 2015 Ladies Tour of Norway was the second edition of the Ladies Tour of Norway, a women's cycling stage race in Norway. It was rated by the UCI as a category 2.2 race.

Route

Stages

Criterium 350 (not part of the Tour)
14 August 2015 – Halden to Halden,

Stage 1
15 August 2015 – Strömstad to Halden,

Stage 2
16 August 2015 – Halden to Halden,

Classification leadership

See also

 2015 in women's road cycling

References

External links

Women's road bicycle races
2015 in women's road cycling
2015 in Norwegian sport